The 2009 Spanish Grand Prix (officially the Formula 1 Gran Premio de España Telefónica 2009) was a Formula One motor race held on 10 May 2009 at the Circuit de Catalunya in Montmeló, Spain. It was the fifth race of the 2009 Formula One season.

It resulted in a one-two finish by Brawn GP drivers Jenson Button and Rubens Barrichello, respectively.

Report

Background
Brawn GP driver Jenson Button led the Drivers Championship by 12 points from teammate Rubens Barrichello, who was a further point ahead of Sebastian Vettel of Red Bull. The top six drivers were from the top three teams of Brawn, Red Bull and Toyota.

Brawn GP led the Constructors' Championship by 22.5 points from Red Bull, who led Toyota by another point. McLaren were the only other team to reach double figures, having scored thirteen points.

The 2009 Spanish Grand Prix was widely anticipated as a restart to the season, with most teams bringing new developments to their cars. Brawn GP made their first upgrades to the BGP 001 in an attempt to remain at the front, whilst Ferrari introduced a new two-tier diffuser to the Ferrari F60, and reduced the weight of Kimi Räikkönen's car. Ferrari also ran KERS on both their cars, despite having reliability problems with it at previous races. Having run KERS on Nick Heidfeld's car for the first four races, and Robert Kubica's car in Bahrain, BMW Sauber raced without the system in Spain. This was due to a significant aerodynamic update to the F1.09 and the need to get the best out of it, which is limited with KERS' weight disadvantage. BMW's aerodynamic update included a new nose, front wing, revised sidepods, a new rear wing and an overall lightening of the chassis. In addition, BMW decided not to introduce a two-tier diffuser in Spain, claiming they would not have been able to exploit the performance benefit it gives. Force India also abandoned plans to run KERS to instead focus on aerodynamic developments, but may run the system later in the year according to team principal Vijay Mallya.

During the previous year's grand prix, McLaren driver Heikki Kovalainen suffered a large crash at turn nine of the circuit. After the race, Mark Webber, a director of the Grand Prix Drivers' Association, said that standards at the track should have been better. Speaking in his regular BBC Sport column, Webber said the run-off area at turn nine was too tight, which could cause an even more serious accident in the future without improvements. In response to this, the FIA made modifications to the track, which should minimise the chances of such a severe accident happening again. The rear of the gravel trap at the turn was raised by 1.5 metres to give a gradual upward incline to slow down cars, while the gravel trap itself has been changed. An additional conveyor belt has been fitted to tyres straight on at the corner, to minimise the chances of a car penetrating the barriers again. Also, the kerb and artificial grass behind the track at turn nine have been extended by ten metres.

Practice and qualifying
Three practice sessions were held before the race; of which two were held on Friday May 8, 2009, with the first in the morning and the second in the afternoon. Both sessions lasted 90 minutes with weather conditions sunny throughout. The third session was held on Saturday morning, lasting for 60 minutes.

In the first practice session, Jenson Button of Brawn GP set the fastest time of 1:21.799. Jarno Trulli of Toyota was second, with the two BMW Sauber cars of Robert Kubica and Nick Heidfeld third and fourth fastest. In the second practice session, Williams' driver Nico Rosberg went quickest with a time of 1.21.588. His teammate, Kazuki Nakajima, was second, with Renault's Fernando Alonso third. The third practice session saw Ferrari leading the way, Felipe Massa ahead of Kimi Räikkönen, with the two Brawn cars over half a second slower in third and fourth.

Qualifying on Saturday afternoon was split into three parts. At the end of the first session, Kimi Räikkönen was knocked out from 16th place. He later admitted his fault, believing his first qualifying lap was good enough to secure passage to the next session. Also knocked out were the Force India's of Giancarlo Fisichella and Adrian Sutil, McLaren's Heikki Kovalainen, and the Toro Rosso of Sébastien Bourdais. The second part of qualifying saw the Toro Rosso of Sébastien Buemi, McLaren's reigning world champion Lewis Hamilton, BMW's Heidfeld, Renault's Nelson Piquet, and Williams' Nakajima all fail to progress. Jenson Button claimed pole position in the final part of qualifying, starting his lap just two seconds before the session ended to put in a time of 1.20.527, one tenth quicker than second-placed Sebastian Vettel in the Red Bull. Button's teammate Rubens Barrichello was third quickest, with Ferrari's Felipe Massa and Red Bull's Mark Webber in fourth and fifth. Toyota's Timo Glock and Jarno Trulli were sixth and seventh fastest, in front of Renault's Alonso, Rosberg in the Williams, and the BMW of Kubica.

Race

 

Rubens Barrichello made a good start from third on the grid and took the lead at the first corner. Jenson Button was running second, whilst the KERS-equipped Ferrari of Felipe Massa was able to gain one place from the start and was placed third ahead of Red Bull's Sebastian Vettel.

An accident on the first lap of the race caused the retirement of Jarno Trulli, Adrian Sutil and both Toro Rosso drivers. Four laps behind the safety car followed while marshals cleared debris from the track. Replays of the incident showed that Nico Rosberg ran wide at turn two, forcing Trulli into the gravel, where he lost control and spun back onto the track, hitting Sutil. Sébastien Buemi and Sébastien Bourdais collided in the aftermath of the initial carnage, when Buemi braked hard to avoid Trulli, and Bourdais ran into the back of his teammate. Lewis Hamilton had been forced onto the grass at the start by Nelson Piquet and had ended up at the back of the field, but was able to avoid the incidents in front of him. Shortly after the safety car pulled in and the race restarted, the McLaren of Heikki Kovalainen suffered from gearbox failure, forcing him to retire.

Barrichello pulled away from Button consistently during the first part of the race. After the first set of pit-stops, it was evident that Barrichello was running a three-stop strategy, while Button and the other front runners were making two stops. Barrichello, however, was unable to create enough of a gap to the chasing pack before his second pit-stop, and lost the lead to Button. After all the other drivers had pitted at least once, Barrichello found himself behind third-placed Massa and fourth-placed Vettel. After the last round of pit-stops were completed, Button was first, while Barrichello had moved up to second, and Red Bull's Mark Webber took third position – the result of a long second stint that Red Bull had opted for in order to emerge in front of the slower Ferrari of Massa. Button had originally been on the same three-stop strategy as Barrichello, but was switched to a two-stop strategy by the team to avoid exiting the pits into the dirty air of Rosberg's Williams.

Ferrari's problems continued as Kimi Räikkönen experienced hydraulic failure on his car, causing him to retire on lap 17. Massa had defended his position against Vettel throughout the afternoon, but late in the race, Ferrari identified a problem in that Massa was consuming more fuel than expected. As he could potentially run out of fuel before the end of the race, Massa was instructed to slow down and conserve fuel, and as a result he lost fourth place to Vettel, then fifth place to Fernando Alonso on the last lap.

Button took his fourth victory of the season, with Brawn GP claiming a one-two finish as Barrichello crossed the line 13 seconds later. Webber took the final podium position, with teammate Vettel behind him in fourth. Alonso was fifth, Massa sixth, Nick Heidfeld, who had significantly closed the gap to Massa in the final lap, had to settle for seventh but in the process breaking Michael Schumacher's record of  24 consecutive finishes, while Nico Rosberg claimed the final point in eighth place. Webber claimed that driving a long stint with a heavy fuel load "felt as though [he] was towing a caravan."

Classification

Qualifying
Cars that used KERS are marked with "‡"

Race

Championship standings after the race 

Drivers' Championship standings

Constructors' Championship standings

 Note: Only the top five positions are included for both sets of standings.

See also 
 2009 Catalunya GP2 Series round

References

External links

 Official results from
 FIA
 Formula1.com

Spanish Grand Prix
Spanish Grand Prix
Grand Prix
May 2009 sports events in Europe